Martialis is an ancient Roman cognomen which may refer to:

 Aulus Vicirius Martialis, Roman senator during the reign of Trajan
 Lucius Caesius Martialis, consul suffectus in AD 57
 Marcus Valerius Martialis, better known as Martial (between 38 and 41 AD–between 102 and 104 AD), poet
 Publius Aelius Martialis, third-century soldier
 Quintus Gargilius Martialis (died before 260), third-century writer on horticulture, botany and medicine
 Quintus Rammius Martialis, equestrian who held at least two important appointments during the reign of the emperors Trajan and Hadrian

Ancient Roman cognomina